Doug Mood (born November 3, 1943) is an American politician in the state of Montana. He served in the Montana House of Representatives from 1996 to 2004. In 2003 he served as Speaker of the House, and from 1999 to 2001 as Speaker pro tempore. Mood is a businessman and attended the University of Montana. From 2005 to 2009, he also served on the Montana Public Service Commission as vice chair.

References

1943 births
Living people
People from Grand Rapids, Minnesota
People from Missoula County, Montana
University of Montana alumni
Businesspeople from Montana
Republican Party members of the Montana House of Representatives
Speakers of the Montana House of Representatives